Thomas Luke Lambert (born 9 May 1981) is an English cricketer.  Lambert is a right-handed batsman who bowls right-arm fast medium pace.  He was born at Ascot, Berkshire.

Lambert made his Minor Counties Championship debut for Berkshire in 1999 against Cheshire.  From 1999 to 2011, he represented the county in 45 Minor Counties Championship matches, winning the Championship once as a player against Eastern Division champions Lincolnshire in 2008.  Lambert also played 28 matches in the MCCA Knockout Trophy for Berkshire, winning it as a player in 2004 against Northumberland and 2011 against Hertfordshire in his final game for the county.   His debut in the Trophy competition came in 2001 when Berkshire played Dorset. 

In 2013 he took over as 1st XI head coach where he has gone on to win the championship in 2016, 2017, 2018 and 2019. As coach he also won the KO trophy in 2013, 2017, 2019 and 2021. In addition to this Lambert led Berkshire to the Minor Counties T20 national title in 2018. In all over 20 seasons with Berkshire Lambert has won 17 titles with the royal county as player and coach. 

Between 2001 and 2005 he represented the county in 7 List-A matches, making his debut against the Middlesex Cricket Board in the 2001 Cheltenham & Gloucester Trophy and his last appearance against Gloucestershire  in the 2005 Cheltenham & Gloucester Trophy. In List-A matches he took 9 wickets at a bowling average of 23.00, with best figures of 2/19 and scored 24 runs at a batting average of 12.00, with a high score of 18*.

In November 2019 he was awarded the ECB Coach Of The Year award. 

In September 2021 he led an England XI at the T10 European Championships in Malaga, Spain. The squad returned home as champions two weeks later beating Belgium in the final by 10 wickets.

References

External links
Tom Lambert at Cricinfo
Tom Lambert at CricketArchive

1981 births
Living people
People from Ascot, Berkshire
English cricketers
Berkshire cricketers